Ricardo H. Hinojosa (born January 24, 1950) is a United States district judge of the United States District Court for the Southern District of Texas and served as the Chairman of the United States Sentencing Commission.

Education and career

Born in Rio Grande City, Texas, Hinojosa received a Bachelor of Arts degree from the University of Texas, Austin in 1972, and a Juris Doctor from Harvard Law School in 1975. He was a law clerk to the Texas Supreme Court from 1975 to 1976. He was then in private practice in McAllen, Texas until 1983.

Federal judicial service
On April 12, 1983, Hinojosa was nominated by President Ronald Reagan to a seat on the United States District Court for the Southern District of Texas vacated by Judge Woodrow Bradley Seals. Hinojosa was confirmed by the United States Senate on May 4, 1983, and received his commission on May 5, 1983. He was appointed as a commissioner on the United States Sentencing Commission by then President George W. Bush in 2003. He served as Chief Judge from 2009 to 2016. If fellow Latino José A. Cabranes assumes senior status as he said he would do in October 2021 after a successor is confirmed, Hinojosa will take his place as the longest-serving federal judge remaining in active service.

See also
 George W. Bush Supreme Court candidates
 List of Hispanic/Latino American jurists

References

Sources
 

1950 births
Living people
Chairpersons of the United States Sentencing Commission
Harvard Law School alumni
Hispanic and Latino American judges
Judges of the United States District Court for the Southern District of Texas
Members of the United States Sentencing Commission
People from McAllen, Texas
People from Rio Grande City, Texas
United States district court judges appointed by Ronald Reagan
20th-century American judges
University of Texas at Austin alumni
21st-century American judges